Lōc-ed After Dark is the debut studio album by American rapper Tone Lōc. It was released on January 23, 1989 via Delicious Vinyl. Production was handled by Matt Dike, Michael Ross and The Dust Brothers. The album reached the number-one spot on the Billboard 200 chart and was certified double platinum by the Recording Industry Association of America. It featured three singles: "Wild Thing", "Funky Cold Medina", and "I Got It Goin' On".

The album's cover is based on Donald Byrd's 1963 album A New Perspective and also features the headlight of a Jaguar e-type sports car.

Track listing

Charts

Weekly charts

Year-end charts

Certifications

See also
List of Billboard 200 number-one albums of 1989

References

External links

Tone Lōc albums
1989 debut albums
Delicious Vinyl albums
Albums produced by the Dust Brothers